The 2019 Women's Under 21 Australian Championships is a field hockey tournament being held in the New South Wales city of Lismore from 10–17 July 2019.

Competition format
The tournament is divided into two pools, Pool A and Pool B, consisting of four teams in a round-robin format. At the conclusion of the pool stage, teams progress to the quarterfinals, where the winners progress to contest the medals, while the losing teams playoff for fifth to eighth place.

Teams

  ACT
  NSW
  NSW B
  QLD
  SA
  TAS 
  VIC 
  WA

Results

Preliminary round

Pool A

Pool B

Classification round

Quarter-finals

Fifth to eighth place classification

Crossover

Seventh and eighth place

Fifth and sixth place

First to fourth place classification

Semi-finals

Third and fourth place

Final

Statistics

Final standings

Goalscorers

External links

References

2019
2019 in Australian women's field hockey
Sports competitions in New South Wales
Lismore, New South Wales